Ángela Felisa María Contreras Radovic (born 27 May 1971) is a Chilean film, theater and television actress. She is recognized for starring in several telenovelas on Televisión Nacional de Chile such as Ámame (1993), Sucupira (1996) and Amores de mercado (2001). The latter, the most watched in the history of Chilean television. She is also the sister of the Chilean politician Cristián Contreras Radovic, leader of the party United Center.

Television

Telenovelas

References

Living people
1971 births
Actresses from Santiago
Chilean television actresses
Chilean telenovela actresses